This is a list of electoral results for the Electoral district of Kanowna in Western Australian state elections.

Members for Kanowna

Election results

Elections in the 1940s

Elections in the 1930s

 Preferences were not distributed.

Elections in the 1920s

Elections in the 1910s

Elections in the 1900s

References

Western Australian state electoral results by district